In the 1951–52 season, USM Marengo is competing in the Division Honneur for the 1st season French colonial era, as well as the Forconi Cup. They competing in Division Honneur, and the Forconi Cup.

Pre-season and friendlies

Competitions

Overview

Division Honneur

League table

Results by round

Matches

Forconi Cup

Squad information

Playing statistics

Goalscorers
Includes all competitive matches. The list is sorted alphabetically by surname when total goals are equal.

References

External links
 L'Echo d'Alger : journal républicain du matin
 La Dépêche quotidienne : journal républicain du matin
 Alger républicain : journal républicain du matin

USMM Hadjout seasons
Algerian football clubs 1951–52 season